Shiv Aroor is an Indian journalist and author. He is an editor and anchor at India Today (TV channel). He is also a defence correspondent, having done conflict reporting from defence zones such as Kashmir, Sri Lanka and Libya. He also runs a defence website called livefistdefence.com which he founded in 2007, which was a winner in the 2012 and 2013 DefenceIQ Blogging Awards in the category Regional Defence blog. He is a post-graduate in international journalism from Cardiff University and a graduate from St Stephen's College, Delhi. He wrote the fictional book, Operation Jinnah, in 2017. In 2018 he co-authored India's Most Fearless and then the sequel in 2019. The first part sold over 40,000 copies.

He is the great grandson of popular Kannada poet and scholar, Sri Panje Mangesh Rao.

Books 
Author

 Operation Jinnah (2017). Juggernaut. 

Co-Author

 India's Most Fearless: True Stories of Modern Military Heroes  (2018), Penguin. Co-authored with Rahul Singh. 
 India's Most Fearless 2: More Military Stories of Unimaginable Courage and Sacrifice (2019), Penguin. Co-authored with Rahul Singh.

References 

Living people
20th-century Indian journalists
21st-century Indian journalists
Indian newspaper editors
Indian male television journalists
Alumni of Cardiff University
St. Stephen's College, Delhi alumni
1980 births
Indian journalists